Smethwick Galton Bridge is a split-level railway station in Smethwick, West Midlands, England. It is at a point where two railways' lines cross on two levels. It has platforms on both lines, allowing interchange between them. The two low-level platforms serve the Birmingham New Street to Wolverhampton Line, while the two high-level platforms serve the Birmingham Snow Hill to Worcester Line. The high level line passes over the low level line at a right angle on a bridge. West Midlands Railway manage the station and operate the majority of its services, with others provided by Chiltern Railways and London Northwestern Railway.

Running parallel to the low-level line is the Birmingham New Main Line canal. The high-level platform extends over the canal, and the line Northbound quickly passes over a surviving section of the higher Old Main Line.

It is an important interchange; 587,287 people changed trains at the station during 2018/19.

History
The station was opened in September 1995 at a cost of £4 million as part of the £28.5 million Jewellery Line scheme to reopen the line between Smethwick and Birmingham Snow Hill station. It was built as an interchange station with the Birmingham New Street-Wolverhampton line, and the platforms on both lines opened at the same time. It is named after the adjacent Galton Bridge. Upon opening, the nearby  station became redundant and was closed soon after. An opening ceremony took place on 24 May 1995 to mark the completion of the new station.

Services

There are four platforms at Smethwick Galton Bridge. Platforms 1 & 2 are on the Birmingham - Worcester line, whilst Platforms 3 & 4 are on the Birmingham - Wolverhampton line.

High-level

Chiltern Railways also offer morning peak services to London Marylebone on the Chiltern Mainline with return journeys in the other direction in the evening, usually terminating at Kidderminster.

On Sundays, the level of service drops to 1tph between Dorridge and Stourbridge Junction and another tph between Stratford-Upon-Avon (via Whitlocks End) and Worcester stations, providing 2tph for Smethwick Galton Bridge between Birmingham Snow Hill and Stourbridge Junction.

Low-level
West Midlands Railway also provide the majority of the services on the lower-level platforms. A half-hourly local stopping service between Birmingham New Street and  operated by   EMUs, calls at all stops between Birmingham and Wolverhampton, with most trains continuing to  after Birmingham New Street. An hourly long-distance service to  run by London Northwestern Railway also calls, originating at Birmingham New Street operated by Class 350 EMUs.

On Sunday, the level of service drops to an hourly local service between Birmingham New Street and Wolverhampton, stopping at all stations on the line.

References

Further reading

External links 

Rail Around Birmingham and the West Midlands: Smethwick Galton Bridge station

Railway stations opened by Railtrack
DfT Category E stations
Railway stations in Great Britain opened in 1995
Railway stations in Sandwell
Railway stations served by Chiltern Railways
Railway stations served by West Midlands Trains
Smethwick